Royal Air Force hospitals were dedicated medical care facilities at strategic locations to cater for RAF personnel. The hospitals were staffed by the medical branches of the Royal Air Force, and would serve as a higher tier of medical facility above the normal station sick quarters, or later, station medical centre. The RAF had many hospitals within the United Kingdom, and additionally had several hospitals abroad.

The Second World War caused an expansion of facilities and locations, however the end of that conflict, and the withdrawal by the RAF from the Middle and Far East, accelerated closures.

History

The first hospital for aviation personnel in the British military was at Hampstead in London. This facility opened in 1917 and was open to those from the Royal Flying Corps and the Royal Naval Air Service. Staffing at RAF Hospitals was based on the number of beds and the work that was undertaken at that facility. Some of the larger bases could have a roll of between 4,000 and 10,000 people to cater for. Halton, Cranwell, Matlock, Ely, and Torquay were considered separate entities from any RAF bases. Halton and Cranwell had 20 and 12 medical officers respectively, whereas the large training bases at Cosford and St Athan only had eight each. The original RAF Officers Hospital was opened at Finchley in 1919, moved to Uxbridge in 1925, and then to Torquay in 1940. A third move was precipitated in October 1942 when the hospital at Torquay was bombed incurring 19 fatalities. Most of the hospitals were built in the 1930s or 1940s, to cater either for the RAF Expansion Period, or due to the outbreak of the Second World War.

The hospitals were spread out across Great Britain, and at strategic points throughout the world. One oddity was Lancashire, which had five RAF Hospitals within its borders (RAF Hospital Cleveleys, RAF Hospital Kirkham, RAF Hospital Morecambe, RAF Hospital Padgate, and RAF Hospital Weeton), which were deemed to be far enough away from enemy action in the Second World War to be relatively safe from bombing. By the second half of the 1980s, the RAF had five service hospitals (three in the UK, and two abroad, Ely, Halton, Wroughton, and Akrotiri and Wegberg respectively). The average that each hospital had in terms of complement of staff was broken down as 22% officers, 54% other ranks, and 24% civilian employees.

By 1996, all RAF hospitals in the UK and abroad had closed apart from the one at RAF Akrotiri, but by that time, the hospital had been changed into a joint asset, rather than strictly just RAF. All three forces in the UK concentrated their medical services at bases and in Ministry of Defence Hospital Units (MDHU), which meant that military medical staff were embedded in public hospitals.

Hospitals in the United Kingdom

Hospitals outside the United Kingdom

See also
RAF Institute of Aviation Medicine
RAF Centre of Aviation Medicine

Notes

References

Sources

External links
PMRAFNS staff relaxing at RAF Hospital Reykjavik

Defunct hospitals in England
Military hospitals in the United Kingdom
Royal Air Force Medical Services
British military hospitals